Edwin Healy (26 September 1909 – 14 June 1995) was an Australian cricketer. He played five first-class cricket matches for Victoria between 1931 and 1932.

See also
 List of Victoria first-class cricketers

References

External links
 

1909 births
1995 deaths
Australian cricketers
Victoria cricketers
Cricketers from Melbourne